Halstow may refer to the following places in Kent, England:

High Halstow
Lower Halstow